The sprite melon is a kind of melon, similar to honeydew, which originates from Japan. Since the late 1990s, it has been cultivated in North Carolina as a specialty crop and has increased in popularity in recent years.

A sprite melon has a round shape and is typically about the size of a grapefruit. It generally ranges in weight from 1.0 to 1.5 lbs. The flesh of a sprite melon is ivory in color and firm, while the peel ranges from ivory (unripe) to yellowish (ripe). As the melon reaches optimal ripeness, horizontal brown markings will appear near the stem. Sprite melon contains seeds. The firm, juicy, sweet flesh of the sprite melon is usually eaten for dessert and tends to resemble the flavor of both pears and honeydew, however it is much sweeter than either of these and can often consist of 18% sugar (25% to 30% more than other melons). The melon is a part of the family Cucurbitaceae, grouped in with cucumbers, gourds, and pumpkins.

See also
 Melon

References

Melons